During the Holocaust, the Jewish population of over 3000 in Bolekhiv (Yiddish: Bolechov, בולוחוב or באלעכוב, Polish: Bolechów) in 1940, with additional thousands of Jews brought in from the surrounding villages and towns in 1941 and 1942, was mostly annihilated, brutally, by the Germans with local Ukrainian collaborators. Only 48 of Bolekhiv's Jews were known to have survived the war.

A wealth of documentation exists about the atrocities committed in this town, beginning already in 1935, before World War II, by the local population and government, and ending with the total annihilation of the Jewish population by 1943. A book, The Lost: A Search for Six of Six Million by Daniel Mendelsohn, tells the story of the town and the demise of its Jews, according to testimony, most of which was found at the Yad Vashem holocaust museum in Jerusalem. A survivor, Shlomo Adler, published a book "I am a Jew Again" about the town in Hebrew, and a German writer Anatol Regnier who married an Israeli singer the daughter of a Jewish Bolechov survivor, wrote another version of the town story "Damals in Bolechów: Eine jüdische Odyssee".

A documentary movie "Neighbors and Murderers" was made, about the books and their authors, following the survivors' stories, and those of some of the Ukrainian neighbors who witnessed what happened, also confronting some of the Ukrainian perpetrators' family. The movie ends with the sister in law of one of the murderers from the Ukrainian police, herself a victim of the communist regime sent to Siberia for many years, asking forgiveness, and the survivor asking if he is allowed to forgive.

The Jews of Bolekhiv 

A Jewish community existed in Bolekhiv (Yiddish pronunciation: Bolechov) since its establishment by Nicholas Gydzincki. The town founder proclaimed equal rights to Jews as Christians, and this was confirmed by Sigismund III Vasa, the king of the new Polish–Lithuanian Commonwealth, formerly crown prince of Poland, the grand duke of Lithuania, and later to become king of Sweden.

By 1890, seventy-five percent of the population of Bolekhiv (4237 people) was Jewish.

Two Jewish residents of Bolekhiv, Moshe Weiss and Josef Rotte, established and participated in the first Kibbutz by the Shomer Hatzair movement in Palestine, and were members of the Shomriya Workers Battalion.

By 1940 the Jewish population of Bolekhiv reached about 3000.
In 1941 and 1942, thousands of Jews were added to the population, from the surrounding towns.
Only 48 Jews of the town survived World War II

A book about 19th century Bolekhiv, "Memoirs of Reb Bear of Bolechov" is known to be one of the important historical documents about Jewish life in Galicia and eastern Europe in those times.

A Hassidic Rebbe, rabbi Shneibalg, 'the Rebbe of Bolechov', had a large Hassidic court in the town.

Antisemitism and the Holocaust 
In 1935 with the death of the Polish leader Joseph Pilsudski, antisemitism began to prevail. The Polish government encouraged citizens to boycott Jewish businesses, and Christian business owners were warned not to do business with Jewish owned companies. These measures caused a deterioration in the economic status of the Jews of Galicia and among them of the Jews of Bolekhiv. From newspaper reports of the time, it is known that the number of violent attacks against Jews was on a rise, and hundreds of Jews were shot and killed.

The first 'Aktion' 
In 1940 the thriving Jewish population of Bolekhiv was about 3000, with 4 major Synagogues.

On 28 and 29 October 1941, four months after capturing the town, and 16days after the first mass murders in Galicia at Stanislavov the German police carried out a first Aktion (German annihilation operation) in Bolekhiv: About 1000 of the richer Jews, doctors, and others including the Rabbis, were taken from their homes, rounded up in the town square and marched to the Dom Katolicki - the catholic center at the north of the town, where they were tortured for 24hours, especially the rabbis, and many killed. They were then taken to the nearby Taniawa forest where they were shot and dropped into a pit and then buried, many of them still alive.

At around the same time the population grew by a few thousand, when Jews from surrounding towns were brought to Bolekhiv.

Ms. Rivka Mondshein gave evidence about this first 'Aktion':

In the documentary "Neighbors and Murderers" the narrator translates other testimony and tells of a woman who was forced to dance naked on the others, and that Rabbi Horowitz who refused to watch was stabbed in the eyes, before being ripped to pieces. A man from the town describing what he saw, said that the shots were done by "our policemen" - 9 Ukrainian policemen. One of them, Matwiecki, was hunted down by the Polish police along with Shlomo Adler, who had joined the Polish police after the war, using his alias name Stanislav. The man had opened fire at the police unit, and Adler threw a grenade, killing the man's wife and baby. Someone else shot the man with the rifle. Years later Adler discovered that they had attacked the wrong person.

The second 'Aktion' 
About a year later, on 3 to 5 September 1942, the Germans committed a second 'Aktion' in which about 1,500 Jews were murdered, many of them children, and an additional 2,000 Jews were sent to the Belzec death camp where most were subsequently murdered.

The Jews had received a warning message from the Judenrat of Drohobitz that a murderous attack was ensuing. Local Ukrainian residents decided to begin the massacre before the Germans arrived. Mostly children were brutally murdered, one baby stamped upon after being grabbed from his tortured mother while giving birth. The Gestapo soldiers bragged that they killed 600 children, and one Ukrainian civilian said that he alone killed 97 children. (Following the war, a son of this man, living in the US, and serving as a priest read about these atrocities and dedicated the rest of his life helping commemorate the Jewish community of Bolekhiv).

A total of 600-700 children and 800-900 adults were killed that day. Two thousand others were gathered and sent to the Belzec death camp. While marching to the train station they were forced to sing, mostly the song "Belz mein shtetele Belz".

In 1946 Ms. Mathilda Geleranter gave the following evidence about the second Aktion in Bolechov:

Further atrocities and 'Aktions' 
Most of the Jews gathered from the nearby towns or originally living in Bolechov were murdered during 1942. Very few hid in dug out caves in the forest and stole food from nearby farms, or joined the Partisans, and survived the war, but mostly all the Jews left in Bolechov were killed.

A list of deportations to the Belzec death camp list 2000 Jews sent on 3 to 6 August 1942 (perhaps this is a mistake and should be 3 to 6 September during the 2nd action) and then 400 Jews deported there on 21 October and another 300 Jews on 20 to 23 November.

In June Dina Ostrover, a survivor of the train ride to Belzec from Stryi, who was in Bolechov with false papers as a Ukrainian, heard that the next day 30 German soldiers were coming to town. It was obvious that they were coming to finish off the Jews. She saved a Jewish accountant who came regularly to the farm and his wife, and hid them in the attic, till the end of the war.

On 25 August 1943, 3200 Jews, who were most of, or the last of the remaining Jews in Bolechov, were deported to the Stanislavov Ghetto or to a camp nearby.

At some stage in 1943, when there were only about 900 Jews left, working at local makeshift "work camps" for a few days, groups of 100 and 200 Jews were marched to the town cemetery nearby and shot. The sounds were heard well in the town, and one woman testified that her mother, who was then at the age of 40, felt obliged to drown out the sound with an old pedal powered sewing machine.

Ukrainian participation in atrocities 
Surviving Jews testified that several local Ukrainians took a major part in the atrocities.

According to Rab Van der Laarse, in an article written for a conference of the European Union Archaeologist Society, Eastern European "national amnesia" is now (since around 2000 and till today at 2014) being contested, with national and international affiliations, including at times affiliation with the Nazi regime as anti-communist, and emphasizing communist post-war atrocities, as well as pre-war and during the war mass murders and other crimes.

In the documentary movie Neighbors and Murderers, neighbours of the cemetery, who remember the killing in the cemetery, differ on the perpetrators. One says that "the Jews were taken like a herd of sheep, the Germans surrounded the Jews in cemetery from three sides..."  but another, when asked who did the actual shooting, said: "They were all our policemen. Nine Ukrainian policemen, there were no Germans at all." Shlomo Adler, one of the Jewish survivors, discovers that the Ukrainian collaborator that disclosed the hiding place of three families living in a cave, was the brother of the woman that saved his own life and hid him throughout the last years of the war.

In the same movie, the sister in law of Matwiecki is confronted by Adler (mistaking her for Matwiecki's actual sister), and upon hearing of her brother in law's actions, at first cannot believe it and claims it's a mistake, but finally realizes the truth and cries along with Adler.

External links 
The Jewish society of Bolechov expatriates including a video of a Taniawa forest ceremony of remembrance
The first letter on Daniel Mendelsohn's Bolechov memorial website
Archaeology of memory. Europe’s Holocaust dissonances in East and West Rab Van der Laarse, paper written for European Union Archaeology Society.
Daniel Mendelsohn (born 1960) The Lost: a search for six of the six million. Harper Collins, 2013. , 9780062314703.
"Neighbors and murderers." Documentary.
"Bolekhiv" Jewish Galicia website.
Old map showing Bolekhiv. Lolikantor website.
Return to My Shtetl Delatyn Shows Bolechov Shtetl images
Neighbors and Murderers movie on the Israeli YNet website (Hebrew)
The book Memories of Rabbi Dov of Bolichov (HebrewBooks website, Hebrew)

Pictures from Jewish Bolechov 
Girls with Ghetto arm bands near the town square in Bolechov. These girls are identified in the movie Neighbors and Murderers.
Site of the first Bolechov Aktion of 1941

Jewish girl friends in Bolechov at 'Courage of the Spirit' blog
Courage of Spirit the story of Esther a Jewish girl who lived for a while in Bolechov, and survived by disguisin herself as a German and Ukrainian. The blog includes several pictures from Bolechov, and some discussion about the hunting of Jews.
Images of the Jewish cemetery on Daniel Mendelsohn's website
Images of the gravestone of Dov Bear of Bolechov and his story

References 

History of Ivano-Frankivsk Oblast
Shtetls
Holocaust locations in Ukraine